Frederick John Dick (18 November 1898 – 23 January 1980) was an Australian rules footballer who played with Melbourne in the Victorian Football League (VFL).

Notes

External links 

1898 births
Australian rules footballers from Melbourne
Melbourne Football Club players
1980 deaths
People from Brunswick, Victoria